The 22nd annual Venice International Film Festival was held from 20 August to 3 September 1961.

Jury
 Filippo Sacchi (Italy) (head of jury)
 Lev Arnshtam (Soviet Union)
 Giulio Cesare Castello (Italy)
 Jean de Baroncelli (France) 
 John Hubley (USA)
 Gian Gaspare Napolitano (Italy)
 Leopoldo Torre Nilsson (Argentina)

Films in competition

Awards
Golden Lion:
Last Year at Marienbad (Alain Resnais)
Special Jury Prize:
Peace to Him Who Enters (Aleksandr Alov)
Volpi Cup:
 Best Actor - Toshiro Mifune - (Yojimbo)
 Best Actress - Suzanne Flon  - (Tu ne tueras point)
Best First Work
Banditi a Orgosolo (Vittorio De Seta)
New Cinema Award
Banditi a Orgosolo (Vittorio De Seta)
San Giorgio Prize
Banditi a Orgosolo (Vittorio De Seta)
FIPRESCI Prize
The Brigand (Renato Castellani)
OCIC Award
Il Posto (Ermanno Olmi)
Pasinetti Award
Peace to Him Who Enters (Aleksandr Alov)
Parallel Sections - Il Posto (Ermanno Olmi)
Italian Cinema Clubs Award
Banditi a Orgosolo (Vittorio De Seta)
Award of the City of Imola
Il Posto (Ermanno Olmi)
Award of the City of Venice
Léon Morin, Priest (Jean-Pierre Melville)

References

External links
 
 Venice Film Festival 1961 Awards on IMDb

Venice International Film Festival
Venice International Film Festival
Venice Film Festival
Film
Venice International Film Festival
Venice International Film Festival